Dezső Novák (3 February 1939 – 26 February 2014) was a Hungarian footballer who played as a defender.

During his club career he played for Ferencvárosi TC. For the Hungary national team, he participated in the 1964 European Nations' Cup. In three Olympic Games, he also won two gold medals in 1964 and 1968, and a bronze medal in 1960.

Later he served as the head coach of Ferencvaros in 1973.

In 2004, he received the Hungarian Order of Merit Officer's Cross.

Novák died on 26 February 2014, at age 75.

Honours
Hungary
 Olympic Games: 1964, 1968, third place: 1960

Individual
UEFA European Championship Team of the Tournament: 1964

References

External links 
 
 
 
 
 

1939 births
2014 deaths
Hungarian footballers
Hungary international footballers
Olympic footballers of Hungary
Olympic gold medalists for Hungary
Olympic bronze medalists for Hungary
Olympic medalists in football
Footballers at the 1960 Summer Olympics
Footballers at the 1964 Summer Olympics
Footballers at the 1968 Summer Olympics
Medalists at the 1960 Summer Olympics
Medalists at the 1964 Summer Olympics
Medalists at the 1968 Summer Olympics
1964 European Nations' Cup players
Ferencvárosi TC footballers
Hungarian football managers
Ferencvárosi TC managers
Ittihad FC managers
Szombathelyi Haladás footballers
Sportspeople from Vas County
Association football defenders
Nemzeti Bajnokság I managers